Pattonsville is an unincorporated community in Scott County, in the U.S. state of Virginia.

History
A post office called Pattonsville was established in 1843, and remained in operation until it was discontinued in 1907. The community was named for Samuel Patton, a local minister.

References

Unincorporated communities in Scott County, Virginia
Unincorporated communities in Virginia